Maute may refer to:

Maute group, an Islamist group in the Philippines
Frederick I, Count of Zollern, nicknamed Maute, Swabian Count

People with the surname
Abdullah Maute, Filipino Islamist
Matthias Maute (born 1963), German recorder player and composer
Omar Maute, Filipino Islamist

See also
Mautes, a French commune
Mauthe